Kučevo can refer to:

 Kučevo, a town and municipality located in the Braničevo District of Serbia
 Kučevo (region), a geographical region in Serbia.
 Banate of Kučevo, a province of the medieval Kingdom of Hungary.